Gabriel Gómez may refer to:

Sportspeople
Gabriel Gómez (footballer, born 1959), Colombian football midfielder
Gabriel Gómez (footballer, born 1984), Panamanian football midfielder
Gabriel Gómez (footballer, born 1997), Argentine football midfielder

Other people
Gabriel Gomez (poet), 21st century Latino poet
Gabriel E. Gomez (born 1965), United States politician, former Navy SEAL
Gabriel Gómez Michel (1965–2014), Mexican paediatrician, academic and politician